The group stage of the 2006 CAF Confederation Cup was played from 12 August to 28 October 2006. A total of eight teams competed in the group stage.

Format
In the group stage, each group was played on a home-and-away round-robin basis. The winners of each group advanced directly to the final.

Groups

Group A
{|class="wikitable" style="text-align: center;"
!width="165"|Team
!width="20"|Pts
!width="20"|Pld
!width="20"|W
!width="20"|D
!width="20"|L
!width="20"|GF
!width="20"|GA
!width="20"|GD
|- align=center bgcolor=ccffcc
|style="text-align:left;"| FAR Rabat
|13||6||4||1||1||9||5||4||Final
|- align=center
|style="text-align:left;"| Olympique Khouribga
|10||6||3||1||2||6||4||2
|- align=center
|style="text-align:left;"| Petro Atlético
|8||6||2||2||2||10||7||3
|- align=center
|style="text-align:left;"| GD Interclube
|3||6||1||0||5||3||12||-9
|}

Group B
{|class="wikitable" style="text-align: center;"
!width="165"|Team
!width="20"|Pts
!width="20"|Pld
!width="20"|W
!width="20"|D
!width="20"|L
!width="20"|GF
!width="20"|GA
!width="20"|GD
|- align=center bgcolor=ccffcc
|style="text-align:left;"| Étoile Sahel
|18||6||6||0||0||15||3||12||Final
|- align=center
|style="text-align:left;"| Espérance
|8||6||2||2||2||10||7||3
|- align=center
|style="text-align:left;"| FC Saint Eloi Lupopo
|4||6||1||1||4||8||12||-4
|- align=center
|style="text-align:left;"| Renacimiento FC
|4||6||1||1||4||6||17||-11
|}

References

External links
2006 CAF Confederation Cup - goalzz.com

Group stage